In Japan, amusement parks have been historically used to describe botanical gardens, festival spaces, and conventional parks with amusement equipment. These parks were originally a place for the wealthy to spend money and time; however, in modern times they have become popular with the general public. 

The first Japanese amusement park, Hanayashiki, opened as a botanical garden at the end of the Edo period, in 1853. The park featured tree peonies and chrysanthemums, but around 1872 a more conventional amusement facility was established. Hanayashiki closed in 1942 due to World War II. Post-war, the park reopened in 1947 as Asakusa Hanayashiki. Tarazuka New Onsen (宝塚新温泉), which was purpose built in 1911 as an amusement park, also claimed the title of oldest amusement park before it closed in 2003.

The longest continually operating amusement park in Japan is Hirakata Park in Osaka. It has been in operation since 1912, and has been renovated multiple times.

Amusement Parks in Edo Period 
During the beginning to mid-Edo period, large botanical gardens were created by Daimyo residences and temples. These gardens were filled with plum, chrysanthemum, and other seasonal flowers and proved popular among wealthy Edo-era people.

In 1852, Saito wrote “Since spring, we have been planting many plum trees in a forest at Sensoji Temple on an area of 6,000 square meters, as well as flowers in all seasons. The pond has been dug to add to the beauty of the area, and resting places have been provided in several places. There is completed in the summer and has been open to the public since June. This was the brainchild of Gardener Rokusaburo”.

Amusement Parks in Meiji and Taisho Period

Amusement Parks as Railway Advertisements

In the Meiji and Taisho period, private railway companies began to build amusement parks around railway stations in order to 
increase the number of passengers.

Takarazuka New Onsen (宝塚新温泉) was established in 1911 by Hankyu Corporation. It was a hot spring facility. Yasuno says that “founder Kobayashi established the Minoh Arima Electric Railway (Hankyu Railway Takarazuka Line now) from Umeda, Osaka to Takarazuka, Hyogo. In addition, he began to develop the railway line, and opened the amusement park in Takarazuka at the end of the line in order to increase the number of passengers.”

Hirakata Park in Hirakata City, Osaka is still in operation today. The park was established by Keihan Electric Railway Co. Ltd., as a botanical garden with chrysanthemum dolls being the main attraction.

Atmosphere of Amusement Parks

At the beginning of the Taisho period, urban entertainment was still dominated by adult males. For example, facilities existed as red-light districts. The entertainment districts with their am-phi theaters and movie theaters were also not very safe. Sightseeing, viewing chrysanthemum puppets and plays, and bathing breaks were major attractions to early amusement parks. These amusement parks were places of relaxation for the wealthy, as most families could not afford to attend these parks.

Amusement Parks in Showa Period 
In the Showa period, the purpose of amusement parks and thus their target audiences changed greatly.

From the mid-1950s onward, large-scale amusement parks with large machines such as roller coasters appeared in many places. As a result, amusement parks, which had been mainly catering to families, succeeded in attracting young people.

The role of amusement parks have changed from entertainment facilities for wealthy adult men to a place of enjoyment for young people and families. Attraction rides and other physical activities are the main features of these new parks.

The Rise of Theme Parks 
Recently, theme parks, which are establishments that charge an admission fee and create an environment around a specific theme, have overtaken amusement parks in popularity.

The 1980s brought a period of stable growth in Japan following a period of high economic growth from the 1950s to the 1970s. During this time, there was a rush to build domestic theme parks in response to Tokyo Disneyland's 1973 opening.

In 2001, Tokyo Disney Sea and Universal Studios Japan opened in Tokyo and Osaka. Universal Studios Japan attracted the same number of visitors as Tokyo Disneyland did in 1973, leading to the era being called the "Top two of East and West". However, domestic theme parks were affected by the post-bubble effect and lost customers because of the domination of Western parks. This led to mass closures.

In the 2000s, the number of small-scale themed attractions, or mini theme parks, increased. These include food museums, which are indoor facilities with a collection of shops specializing in a single cuisine or genre of food, job experience parks including KidZania, and car theme parks including MEGAWEB.

Modern Amusement Parks 
While theme parks are diversifying and developing, amusement parks are slowly closing. The aging population of Japan, as well as the country's low birthrate, are leading to fewer numbers of visitors every year. In addition, most foreign tourists prefer to visit large American theme parks such as Universal Studios Japan and Tokyo Disney Resort.

In recent years, theme parks have made large capital investments into their parks in order to maintain and introduce attractions. However, domestic amusement parks have not had the financial resources to invest in maintenance or new attractions.

Effects of the COVID-19 pandemic

During the COVID-19 pandemic, most of Japan's amusement parks and theme parks were forced to close due to Japan government policy. However, they have gradually begun to reopen with the lifting of state of emergency. These reopening parks are required to operate in accordance with the “Guidelines for Prevention of the Spread of the Novel Corona-virus at Amusement Parks and Theme Parks”, which were prepared based on the Japan government's “Basic Policies for Prevention and Control of the Novel Corona-virus”, and are operating with various restrictions and infection prevention measures in place. Examples of restrictions include required reservations, cancellation of certain events, shortened hours, and limited admission.

References